Sint Maarten is a constituent country of the Kingdom of the Netherlands in the Caribbean. Sint Maarten's capital is Philipsburg. Collectively, Sint Maarten and the other Dutch islands in the Caribbean are often called the Dutch Caribbean.

Before 10 October 2010, Sint Maarten was known as the Island Territory of Sint Maarten, and was one of six island territories that constituted the Netherlands Antilles. Sint Maarten has the status of an overseas country and territory (OCT) and is not part of the European Union.

On 6 and 7 September 2017, the island was hit by Category 5 Hurricane Irma, which caused widespread and significant damage to buildings and infrastructure.

Etymology
The island was named by Christopher Columbus in honour of St Martin of Tours, as he first sighted it on the saint's feast day on 11 November 1493.

"Sint Maarten" is Saint Martin in Dutch.

History

Pre-colonial
Sint Maarten had been inhabited by Amerindian peoples for many centuries, with archaeological finds pointing to a human presence on the island as early as 2000 BC. These people most likely migrated from South America. The earliest identified group were the Arawak people who are thought to have settled around the period 800 BC – 300 BC. Circa 1300-1400 AD they began to be displaced with the arrival of Carib people.

Arrival of Europeans

It is commonly believed that Christopher Columbus named the island in honor of Saint Martin of Tours when he encountered it on his second voyage of discovery. However, he actually applied the name to the island now called Nevis when he anchored offshore on November 11, 1493, the feast day of Saint Martin. The confusion of numerous poorly charted small islands in the Leeward Islands meant that this name was accidentally transferred to the island now known as Saint-Martin/Sint Maarten.

Nominally Spanish territory, the island became the focus of the competing interest of the European powers, notably France, Britain and the Netherlands. While the French wanted to colonize the islands between Trinidad and Bermuda, the Dutch found San Martín a convenient halfway point between their colonies in New Amsterdam (present day New York) and New Holland. Meanwhile, the Amerindian population began to decline precipitously, dying from introduced diseases to which they had no immunity.

The Dutch built a fort (Fort Amsterdam) on the island in 1631; Jan Claeszen van Campen became its first governor and the Dutch West India Company began mining salt on the island. Tensions between the Netherlands and Spain were already high due to the ongoing Eighty Years' War, and in 1633 the Spanish captured St Martin and drove off the Dutch colonists. At Point Blanche, they built what is now Old Spanish Fort to secure the territory. The Dutch under Peter Stuyvesant attempted to wrest back control in 1644, but were repulsed. However, in 1648 the Eighty Years' War ended and the Spanish, no longer seeing any strategic or economic value in the island, simply abandoned it.

With Saint Martin free again, both the Dutch and the French jumped at the chance to re-establish their settlements. Dutch colonists came from St. Eustatius, while the French came from St. Kitts. After some initial conflict, both sides realized that neither would yield easily. Preferring to avoid an all-out war, they signed the Treaty of Concordia in 1648, which divided the island in two. During the treaty's negotiation, the French had a fleet of naval ships off shore, which they used as a threat to bargain more land for themselves. In spite of the treaty, relations between the two sides were not always cordial. Between 1648 and 1816, conflicts changed the border sixteen times. The entire island came under effective French control from 1795 when Netherlands became a puppet state under the French Empire until 1815.

18th–19th centuries
To work the new cotton, tobacco and sugar plantations the French and Dutch began importing large numbers of African slaves, who soon came to outnumber the Europeans. The slave population quickly grew larger than that of the land owners. Subjected to cruel treatment, slaves staged rebellions, and their overwhelming numbers made it impossible to ignore their concerns. In 1848, the French abolished slavery in their colonies including the French side of St. Martin. Slaves on the Dutch side of the island protested and threatened to flee to the French side to seek asylum. The local Dutch authorities then freed the colonies' slaves. While this decree was respected locally, it was not until 1863 when the Dutch abolished slavery in all of their island colonies that the slaves became legally free.

20th century

After the abolition of slavery, plantation culture declined and the island's economy suffered. In 1939 Sint Maarten received a major boost when it was declared a duty-free port. In 1941 the island was shelled by a German U-boat as part of the Battle of the Atlantic.

Tourism began growing from the 1950s onward, and Princess Juliana International Airport became one of the busiest in the Eastern Caribbean. For much of this period, Sint Maarten was governed by business tycoon Claude Wathey of the Democratic Party. The island's demographics changed dramatically during this period as well, with the population increasing from a mere 5,000 people to around 60,000 people by the mid-1990s. Immigration from the neighbouring Lesser Antilles, Curaçao, Haiti, the Dominican Republic, the United States, Europe, and Asia turned the native population into a minority.

Sint Maarten became an "island territory" (eilandgebied in Dutch) of the Netherlands Antilles in 1983. Before that date, Sint Maarten was part of the island territory of the Windward Islands, together with Saba and Sint Eustatius. The status of an island territory entails considerable autonomy summed up in the Island Regulation of the Netherlands Antilles. During this period Sint Maarten was ruled by an island council, an executive council, and a lieutenant governor appointed by the Dutch Crown.

Hurricane Luis in late August and early September 1995 hit the island, causing immense destruction and resulting in 12 deaths.

21st century
In 1994, the Kingdom of the Netherlands and France had signed the Franco-Dutch treaty on Saint Martin border controls, which allows for joint Franco-Dutch border controls on so-called "risk flights". After some delay, the treaty was ratified in November 2006 in the Netherlands and subsequently entered into force on 1 August 2007. Though the treaty is now in force, its provisions are not yet implemented as the working group specified in the treaty is not yet installed.

On 10 October 2010 Sint Maarten became a constituent country within the Kingdom of the Netherlands, making it a constitutional equal partner with Aruba, Curaçao, and the Netherlands proper. Constitution Day (10 October) is celebrated annually as a public holiday.

Sint Maarten has been assigned the ISO 3166-1 alpha-2 country codes of SXM and SX, and the .sx Internet ccTLD became available to register on 15 November 2012.

Effects of Hurricane Irma

Hurricane Irma made landfall on 6 September 2017, causing extensive damage. 4 deaths were ultimately reported; there were 11 serious injuries out of a total of 34. Princess Juliana Airport was extensively damaged but reopened on a partial basis in two days to allow incoming relief flights and for flights that would take evacuees to other islands. By 8 September, "many inhabitants [were] devoid of basic necessities" and looting had become a serious problem. Reports on 9 September indicated that 70% of the infrastructure on the Dutch part had been destroyed. A survey by the Dutch Red Cross estimated that nearly a third of the buildings in Sint Maarten had been destroyed and that over 90 per cent of structures on the island had been damaged.

The prime minister of the Netherlands, Mark Rutte, told the news media on 8 September that the airport in Sint Maarten was ready to receive emergency flights and that aid, as well as police officers and military personnel, were on their way. The prime minister of Sint Maarten, William Marlin, had already asked the Dutch government for extended relief assistance which began to arrive on 8 September. The government issued a tropical storm warning on 8 September since the Category 4 Hurricane Jose was approaching.

The government of the Netherlands was sending aid, as well as additional police and military, since looting was a serious problem. A statement by Marlin summarized the situation on 8 September. "We've lost many, many homes. Schools have been destroyed. We foresee a loss of the tourist season because of the damage that was done to hotel properties, the negative publicity that one would have that it's better to go somewhere else because it's destroyed. So that will have a serious impact on our economy." At the time, preparations were being made as Hurricane Jose approached the island. Government estimates on 9 September indicated that 70 percent of houses were badly damaged or destroyed; much of the population was living in shelters pending the arrival of Jose. Thankfully, this second hurricane did not have a significant impact on the island.

Widespread looting had started and a state of emergency was announced; some 230 soldiers from the Netherlands were patrolling. Additional Dutch troops were expected. By 10 September, some 1,200 Americans had been evacuated to Puerto Rico from Sint Maarten by military aircraft during a time of looting and violence. On that date, Royal Caribbean International said that the company was sending its Adventure of the Seas to Saint-Martin and to St. Thomas to provide supplies and to offer evacuation services. The ship arrived on the island on 10 September with water, ice, garbage bags, clothing and canned food, and evacuated 320 people. By 11 September, King Willem-Alexander had already arrived in Curaçao and was scheduled to visit St. Maarten, St. Eustatius and Saba. When King Willem-Alexander visited Sint Maarten for the first time post-hurricane, he was shocked by the destruction. He immediately called for support from the European Union so the island could recover swiftly. Later in the month, it was revealed that the EU would allocate €2 billion in emergency funds for immediate disaster relief to restore basic essentials on Sint Maarten, such as drinking water and sanitation. In addition to the EU's contribution, Red Cross, the government of the Netherlands, and Dutch citizens of the mainland pitched in (via donations and crowdfunding) to raise money for the devastated island.

Post hurricane rebuilding
On 10 October 2017, Princess Juliana International Airport re-commenced commercial flights using temporary structures, pending repairs.

A report in late March 2018 indicated that the airport was able to handle some flights and some service had resumed from the US, Canada, and Europe. A new departure lounge was being used during rebuilding of the original facility. The General Aviation building was being used for passengers arriving on the island.

A little over a year after Hurricane Irma, St Maarten's cruise industry had recovered to the extent that in 2018, more than 1 million cruise passengers visited the island.

Telecommunications, including Wi-Fi, had been restored on the island, 95% of customers were receiving electricity and drinking water was readily available on the island. Some tourist accommodations were open, with 27 operating and 36 said to be ready sometime later this year. Cruise ships were arriving; a full 14 were accommodated the week of February 18, 2018.

Geography 

Sint Maarten occupies the southern part of the island of Saint Martin in the Leeward Islands; the northern half forms the French territory of Saint Martin. To the north across the Anguilla Channel lies the British Overseas Territory of Anguilla, to the south-east of the island lies the French island of Saint Barthélemy, and further south are the Dutch islands of Saba and Saint Eustatius.

The terrain is generally hilly, with the highest peak being Mount Flagstaff at 383m. The area to the west around the airport is flatter, and contains the Dutch section of the Simpson Bay Lagoon. The Great Salt Pond lies to north of Philipsburg. Several small islands lie off the coast. Little Key lies in the Simpson Bay Lagoon.

There are ten total islands in Sint Maarten, including:

Saint Martin (southern part), 
Cow and Calf Island, 
Guana Key of Pelikan, 
Hen and Chicken, 
Little Key, 
Molly Beday, 
Mona Island, 
Pelikan Key, 
Pond Island, 
Snoopy Island,

Climate
Sint Maarten has a tropical savanna climate (Köppen Aw), and is drier than most parts of the northeastern Caribbean because of a rain shadow from the island's mountains, drying the trade winds. The driest months are from January to July, and the wettest from September to November, when hurricanes can strike the island.

Government and politics 

Sint Maarten is a constituent country of the Kingdom of the Netherlands, and as such the monarch of the Netherlands is head of state, represented locally by a governor. Following the dissolution of the Netherlands Antilles, the Constitution of Sint Maarten was unanimously adopted by the island council of Sint Maarten on 21 July 2010. Elections for a new island council were held on 17 September 2010, since the number of seats was increased from 11 to 15. The newly elected island council became the Estates of Sint Maarten on 10 October. Sint Maarten is largely autonomous in internal affairs, with the Netherlands responsible for foreign diplomacy and defence. The first woman to be the president of Sint Maarten was Gracita Arrindell, who was first elected in 2010.

There currently is a movement in Sint Maarten aiming for the unification of island of Saint Martin, which has its own flag.

Foreign policy and defence 
The Kingdom of the Netherlands has overarching responsibility for foreign relations, defence and Dutch nationality law in the Caribbean parts of the Kingdom. A detachment of the Royal Netherlands Marine Corps is present on Sint Maarten and the Royal Netherlands Navy deploys a guardship, normally a Holland-class offshore patrol vessel, in the Caribbean on a rotational basis together with the  support vessel HNLMS Pelikaan which operates out of Curacao. Additionally, the Dutch Caribbean Coast Guard, directed by the commander of the Royal Netherlands Navy in the Caribbean, is operational and funded by the four constituent countries of the Kingdom.

Environmental laws
The beach policy (as of 1994) views the beach from the perspective of being an ecosystem service for recreational activities. This is because the economy on Sint Maarten is tourism-driven and many tourists come to the island to enjoy the 37 beaches on the island. The policy has three main points: the beach must be usable for everyone, developments negatively affecting recreational use will be prevented, and beaches should be protected against human influences that could impair their recreational function. The policy's main purpose is to protect the recreational value of the beach. The laws do not consider the protection and ecological value of this habitat in regard to protecting nesting sea turtles, preserving the beach line, or preserving the plants that live in and along the beach line.

The hillside policy, as of 1998, is mainly concerned with residential development. On the hillside, only residential development is permitted, certain hillsides with important “visual impact” are protected and conserved for their general landscape. A natural park is projected for the following hills: Cole Bay Hill, Sentry Hill, St. Peters Hill, Concordia Hill, Marigot Hill, Waymouth Hill, and Williams Hill. The policy stated the main objective was to conserve and maintain the green hillside and restore any natural habitats if needed. However, as of 2020, these natural parks have not yet been established.

Corruption
In 1978, the government of the Netherlands Antilles installed a Research Committee on the Windward Islands to investigate claims of corruption in the island government. Even though the report issued by this commission was damaging for the island's government, measures were not put into place to curb corruption, arguably because the government of the Netherlands Antilles depended on the support of Wathey's Democratic Party in the Estates of the Netherlands Antilles. In August 1990, the public prosecutor of the Netherlands Antilles started an investigation into the alleged ties between the island government of Sint Maarten and the Sicilian Mafia, and in 1991 the Court of Audit of the Netherlands Antilles issued a report which concluded that the island government of Sint Maarten was ailing.

In the government and parliament of the Netherlands, the call for measures became louder. With Dutch pressure, the government of the Netherlands Antilles installed the Pourier Commission tasked with investigating the state of affairs of the island government of Sint Maarten in December 1991. Its report concluded that the island was in a severe financial crisis, that rules of democratic decision-making were continuously broken, and that the island government constituted an oligarchy. In short, the island government failed completely according to the report. After long negotiations, the Kingdom government enacted a General Measure of Kingdom Administration in early 1993, placing Sint Maarten under direct supervision of the Kingdom. Although originally meant for one year, the Order-in-Council for the Kingdom was eventually extended until 1 March 1996.

Though much has changed since, allegations of criminal activities continue to plague Sint Maarten. In 2004, the Minister of Justice of the Netherlands Antilles asked the Scientific Research and Documentation Centre ( (WODC)) of the Dutch Ministry of Justice to conduct research into organized crime in Sint Maarten. The report concluded that money laundering and cocaine trade are widespread on Sint Maarten. It also alleged that money from the island was used to finance Hamas, its associate Holy Land Foundation, and the Taliban.

In April 2009, former Commissioner Louie Laveist was convicted, and sentenced to an 18-month prison sentence, by the Sint Maarten Court-of-First-Instance, on account of forgery, fraud, and bribery. He was later acquitted of forgery and of fraud by the Common Court of Justice of the Netherlands Antilles and Aruba, but not of bribery.

Ecology

Plants
Sint Maarten is home to many distinctive plants such as hibiscus, yellow sage (seen on the flag), flamboyant trees, mahogany, and cacti. An estimated 522 wild plants are present, mainly being seed plants and a few ferns. The Calyptranthes boldinghgii and Galactia nummelaria are “island-endemic” and it is suspected that they have already gone extinct. Much of the hilltops are semi-evergreen seasonal forests which are rare in region.

The categorization of native, introduced, and invasive plant species is not as well documented for the island. Some of the introduced plant species include: manila grass (Zoysia matrella), Spanish bayonet ( Yucca aloifolia), Singapore almond (Terminalia catappa), true aloe (Aloe vera). Some of the native species are west Indian holly (Tunera ulmifolia), spiny amaranth (Amaranthus spinosus), bell pepper (Capsium pulcherrima), salt heliotrope (Heliotropium curassavicum), bay rum tree (pimento racemose), and sourbush (pluchea carolinesis). One of the invasive species on the island is crowfoot grass (Dactyloctenium aegyptium).

Mullet Pond 

Mullet Pond, a section of the inland lagoon Simpson Bay Lagoon, is home to 70% of Sint Maarten's mangrove population on the Dutch side of the island. Mangroves are a nursery for many young fish and during hurricane season they provide coastal protection. The area, however, is at risk due to dredging, tourism activities, and the yacht industry on the island.

Mullet Pond is the 55th Ramsar site since 2016 and therefore protected according to the Ramsar Treaty, a global commitment to protect ecologically significant wetland areas.

Challenges

The effects of climate change are felt on Sint Maarten. According to the Netherlands Antilles Coral Reef Initiative the coral reefs were fragmented due to a temperature rise to 30 °C in 2005. Twenty years ago, the sea grass beds were much larger. Natural disasters (hurricanes), development, and a tourism-based industry caused a significant decrease over the years. The seagrass beds are important for anchoring the sand in place as well as hurricane protection. Without the seagrass bed sand can easily be moved by a hurricane resulting in the loss of beaches or sand accumulates in one area, impacting marine life.

Demographics 

In the 2011 Netherlands Antilles census, the population of the island territory was 33,609. In the 2017 census the total population of the country was 40,535.

Settlements
 Philipsburg (1,894 inhabitants)
 Lower Prince's Quarter (10,833 inhabitants)
 Cul de Sac (8,588 inhabitants)
 Cole Bay (7,194 inhabitants)
 Upper Prince's Quarter (4,595 inhabitants)
 Little Bay (Fort Amsterdam) (5,581 inhabitants)
 Simpson Bay (1,142 inhabitants)
 Lowlands (708 inhabitants)

Religion

Languages

English is the everyday language of communication in Sint Maarten, and also the first language of native Sint Maarteners. A local variety of Virgin Islands Creole is spoken in informal situations by Sint Maarteners between themselves. Most Sint Maarteners learn Dutch as a second language, and only use it when communicating with other Dutch speakers.

The government uses the Dutch language when communicating with the Dutch government and also formerly did so with the Netherlands Antilles government.

Local signage uses both Dutch and English.
The main languages are English and Dutch.
There were English-medium and Dutch-medium schools on Sint Maarten, and the Dutch government policy towards St. Maarten and other SSS islands promoted English medium education.

As per the 2001 census there were far more Spanish speakers than Dutch speakers, amounting to 14.8% and 4.2% of the population, respectively. Sint Maarten is a polyglot society, most are simultaneously bilingual in Dutch and English, and among them are also speakers of Spanish and French. Linguist Linda-Andrea Richardson stated in 1983 that Dutch was a "dead language" in Sint Maarten.

Some residents, including Arubans and St. Martiners who lived in Aruba, speak Papiamento.

Economy

Sint Maarten, along with Curaçao, uses the Netherlands Antillean guilder as its currency. The economy is heavily dependent on tourism, either from long-stays or day-trippers from the many cruise lines that dock in the Philipsburg Harbour; around 80% of the workforce is employed in this sector. Some limited agriculture occurs, however most food is imported.

In 2014, St. Maarten had more gaming machines per resident than any other country in the world.

Hurricane Irma severely affected the economy in 2017. In a 2019 report, it was revealed that the island's GDP had dropped by 4.7%, with an increase in inflation. This drastic hit to the economy was due to lessened tourism, real estate, trade, and business activities.

Culture 

Sint Maarten's culture is a mix of African, European and North American influences. Ank Klomp wrote in Saint Martin: Communal Identities on a Divided Caribbean Island that Sint Maarten lacked a Dutch cultural identity.

Festivals
An annual regatta is held over three days culminating in the first weekend in March. Among the leading cultural artists of the island are Isidore "Mighty Dow" York (kaisonian, panman), Roland Richardson (Impressionist painter), Nicole de Weever (dancer, broadway star), Ruby Bute (painter, storyteller, poet), Clara Reyes (choreographer), Susha Hien (choreographer), Lasana M. Sekou (poet, author, independence advocate), Drisana Deborah Jack (visual artist, poet), and Tanny and The Boys (string band music group). The annual St. Maarten Carnival starts in April and ends in May. The Grand Carnival parade that takes place on the Dutch side is the largest parade of the island's two carnivals. The annual St. Martin Book Fair takes place during the first weekend of June, featuring emerging and famous authors from the island, the Caribbean region, and from around the world.

Sport
Popular team sports in Sint Maarten include baseball, basketball, volleyball, cricket, and soccer. Recreational fishing, golf, and water sports (including diving, kayaking, snorkelling, and yachting) are popular amongst tourists.

The Sint Maarten Soccer Association was founded in 1986. The organisation is not a member of FIFA, but became an associate member of CONCACAF in 2002, and a full member in 2013. The national football team debuted in 1989, and plays its home games at the Raoul Illidge Sports Complex, which has a 3,000-spectator capacity. After an initial period of popularity during the 1990s, including an appearance at the 1993 Caribbean Cup, interest in football declined, with the national team playing its last official match in 2000 (against Dominica). However, Sint Maarten returned to international competition in March 2016, for the 2017 Caribbean Cup qualification tournament.

The Sint Maarten Cricket Association is a member of the Leeward Islands Cricket Association (LICA), which is, in turn, a member of the West Indies Cricket Board (WICB). With rare exceptions (for instance, the Stanford 20/20), the national cricket team plays only against other LICA members, though Sint Maarteners may go on to play for the Leeward Islands team at regional level and are eligible for both the West Indies and the Netherlands internationally. The primary venue for cricket is the Charles Vlaun Cricket Field. Colin Hamer was the first Sint Maartener to play first-class cricket, while Daniel Doram was the first islander to play at international level, debuting for the Netherlands against Ireland in the Intercontinental Cup in July 2013 at the age of 15, also becoming the first St. Maartener to take a first-class five-wicket haul. In 2016 Keacy Carty became the first St Maartener to play representative cricket for the West Indies (for the West Indies under-19s). Carty was the man of the final at the 2016 Under-19 World Cup, and was later described by the prime minister, William Marlin, as having "brought the name of St Maarten to international acclaim".

Prior to cricket becoming popular, baseball was preferred. No national team existed, although Sint Maarteners were eligible to play for the Netherlands Antilles baseball team before its dissolution. Several Sint Maarteners have passed through the American baseball system, playing at college level or in the minor leagues. Allen Halley played college baseball for the South Alabama Jaguars and was drafted by the Chicago White Sox in the 30th round of the 1995 draft, reaching Class A-Advanced in the minor leagues. Three others, Rene Leveret, Marc Ramirez, and Rafael Skeete, were signed as free agents by major league teams during their careers, but played only in the minor leagues.

The Sint Maarten Volleyball Association is part of the Eastern Caribbean Volleyball Association, which hosts championship qualifiers with countries within its zone. Countries that are part of the ECVA are: Anguilla, Antigua, Bermuda, Virgin Islands, Dominica, Dutch St.Martin, French St.Martin, Grenada, Montserrat, Saba, St. Eustatius, St.Kitts, St.Lucia, and St. Vincent & the Grenadines. Over the past 8 years, volleyball in St.Maarten on a National level has been developing and showing results. In 2016, the Sint Maarten Men's National Team went on to win the championship in their pool for the round 1 World Championship Qualifiers winning the gold along with many individual awards. The local awardees were; Nicholas Henrietta (Best Setter); Leonardo J Jeffers (Best Outside Hitter); Stephan Ellis (Best Middle); Allinton Augustine (Best Defence); Riegmar Valies Courtar (Best Opposite), and Riegmar Valies Courtar (Best Scorer) and MVP Most Valuable Player.

Popular culture 

The island is famous for its runway at Princess Juliana International Airport, in which landing aircraft pass within  of Maho Beach below, due to the close proximity of the runway to the ocean. The planes appear to land dangerously close to beach goers so the beach and airport have become a popular place for people to view aeroplane landings. In July 2017, a New Zealander died from head injuries after being propelled backwards from a jet engine blast.

Sint Maarten is also known for its festive nightlife, expansive beaches, precious jewelry, traditional cuisines, and plentiful casinos.

Education 
Previously residents had to complete secondary studies in Aruba or Curaçao. Prior to 1976 Sint Maarten had two secondary schools: the government secondary school John Phillips School and the Catholic secondary school Pastoor Nieuwen Huis School. Philips was both a MAVO/ETAO school while Huis was a MAVO school. The foundation Stichting Voortgezet Onderwijs van de Bovenwindse Eilanden, established on February 20, 1974, was created as the neutral governing body for a new school created by the merger of Phillips and Huis schools. MPC, the merged school, opened on August 17, 1976.

The Caribbean International Academy (CIA), founded in 2003 is a preparatory private boarding and day school on the island of St. Maarten. Catering to children from Kindergarten to Grade 12, CIA is also the only school offering Canadian/Ontario High School Diploma (OSSD) and 90% of their graduates go on to attend universities in Europe, Canada and the United States. Learning Unlimited Preparatory School (LUPS) is an American accredited institution, that established a Caribbean location in St.Maarten in 1991. The school is accredited by the Southern Association of Independent Schools and the Southern Association of Colleges and Schools.

Most residents who attend tertiary institutions do so in Curaçao or European Netherlands.

The American University of the Caribbean School of Medicine (AUC), founded in 1978, was previously located on Montserrat. Because of the eruption of the Soufrière Hills volcano in 1995, AUC moved its campus to St. Maarten later that year. A permanent campus was completed in 1998 in Cupecoy.

The University of St. Martin is located in Philipsburg. The University of Sint Eustatius School of Medicine, founded in 1999, was previously located on Sint Eustatius. In September 2013, the University of Sint Eustatius moved its campus to Cole Bay, St. Maarten.

Philipsburg Jubilee Library in Philipsburg was the most prominent library in Sint Maarten. However, after Hurricane Irma hit the island in 2017, the library was forced to shut down. , Philipsburg Jubilee Library still lacks the funding necessary for it to be rebuilt, but has recently reopened in a temporary location until further notice.

Transportation 

Sint Maarten is served by Princess Juliana International Airport, serving destinations across the Caribbean, North America and France and the Netherlands. It is well known for its very low final approach landings close to a popular beach at the end of the runway. Winair has its headquarters on the grounds of the airport.

See also 

 List of designated monuments in Sint Maarten
 List of divided islands
 Postage stamps and postal history of Sint Maarten

Notes

References 
 Gert Oostindie (1998) paradijs overzee: de 'Nederlandse' Caraïben en Nederland. Amsterdam: Bert Bakker.
 Gert Oostindie and Inge Klinkers (2001) Knellende koninkrijksbanden: het Nederlandse dekolonisatiebeleid in de Caraïben, 1940–2000. Amsterdam: Amsterdam University Press.
 Joseph H. Lake, Jr. (2004) Friendly Anger - The rise of the labor movement in St. Martin. St. Martin: House of Nehesi Publishers. .
 Lasana M. Sekou, ed. (1997, Third printing) National Symbols of St. Martin - A Primer. St. Martin: House of Nehesi Publishers.
 Louis Duzanson (2000, 2003) An Introduction to Government - Island territory of St. Maarten. St. Martin: House of Nehesi Publishers. .
 Richardson, Linda-Andrea. "The socio-linguistic situation in St. Maarten." In: Carrington, Lawrence D. (editor). Studies in Caribbean Language. Society for Caribbean Linguistics, 1983. p. 63-69..
 Rhoda Arrindell (2014) Language, Culture, and Identity in St. Martin. St. Martin: House of Nehesi Publishers. Language Culture and Identity in St Martin.

External links

Government
Official website of the Sint Maarten government

Sint Maarten
Mullet Pond: Protected Ramsar site|Protecting the Natural Areas of St. Maarten

Organizations
 Philipsburg Jubilee Public Library
 St. Maarten Chamber of Commerce and Industry (official site).
 St. Maarten Hospitality and Trade Association (official trade association site).
 House of Nehesi Publishers (book publishing/research/PR foundation).

Universities
 American University of the Caribbean School of Medicine
 University of St. Martin

Secondary education
 Caribbean International Academy
 Learning Unlimited Preparatory School
 St. Dominic High School
 St. Maarten Academy

Tourism
Sint Maarten. The World Factbook. Central Intelligence Agency
 St. Maarten Tourist Bureau (official site)
 St. Maarten Hospitality and Trade Association (visitor information)
 St. Maarten Tourism Map (visitor information) 
 Princess Juliana International Airport (official site)
 St. Maarten Excursions
 GAYSXM tourism (official site)
SXM RALLY TOURS

News and opinion
 The Today Newspaper, local daily newspaper.
 St. Maarten Daily Herald , local newspaper.
 St. Maarten Island Times
 Soualiga Newsday
 St. Maarten News

 
Caribbean countries of the Kingdom of the Netherlands
Island countries
Islands of the Netherlands Antilles
Saint Martin (island)
Dutch-speaking countries and territories
English-speaking countries and territories
States and territories established in 2010
2010 establishments in the Netherlands Antilles
Sint Maarten